Honeoye Lake is one of the Finger Lakes located in Ontario County, New York. Most of the lake is within the town of Richmond but a smaller southwestern part is in the town of Canadice. The hamlet of Honeoye is just north of the lake.

The name Honeoye comes from the Seneca word ha-ne-a-yah, which means lying finger, or where the finger lies. The name comes from the local story of a Native American whose finger was bitten by a rattlesnake and who therefore cut off his finger with a tomahawk.

Description

Honeoye Lake is the second smallest of the Finger Lakes and is located to the west of the major lakes. To its west are other minor Finger Lakes: Canadice Lake, Hemlock Lake, and Conesus Lake. As with the other Finger Lakes, Honeoye Lake was created by the advance and subsequent melting of continental glaciation.

It is also relatively shallow and warmer than the other Finger Lakes. Its outlet is Honeoye Creek, which flows northward. A major feeder stream, called Honeoye Inlet, enters the lake at the south end.

The hamlet of Honeoye in the Town of Richmond is located at its northern end. The Honeoye Lake Park Association administers a large tract of summer cottages and year-round dwellings known as the Times-Union Tract just south of the hamlet on the east side of the lake.

Recreation
The shore of the lake has a high density of recreation homes, many with docks for boats and other recreation vehicles. In warmer weather, fishing is considered exceptional in Honeoye Lake. Walleye, bass, perch and bluegill are some of the recreational and tournament fish that can be found. Popular recreational activities also include boating, tubing, water skiing, wake boarding, and other water sports.

The Ring of Fire tradition is annually celebrated Labor Day weekend by area residents. Flares are lit around the lakeshore to signify summer's end and to recognize the wealth of the Finger Lakes harvest. In the winter, the water freezes quickly and maintains its solid surface throughout the season, at which time the lake is used for ice fishing, skating, and ice boating.

Public places
On the north end of the lake is Sandy Bottom Park, which includes a life guarded beach, two playgrounds, and multiple pavilions. There is also a boat launch that is available from May 15 to Labor Day.

Honeoye Lake Boat Launch State Park is available on the east side, towards the south end of the lake, and is open from May to November. Harriet Hollister Spencer State Recreation Area, located on Canadice Hill south of the lake, overlooks Honeoye Lake.

Environmental Issues 
In recent years the lake has suffered from water quality problems including shoreline erosion due to boating and blue-green algae blooms.

References

External links

Honeoye Lake Watershed Task Force: 2005 Honeoye Lake Watershed Management Plan
Honeoye Lake Boat Launch State Park
Live webcam, south end of lake, west side

Finger Lakes
Lakes of Ontario County, New York
Tourist attractions in Ontario County, New York
Lakes of New York (state)